Davao Christian High School, is a Filipino-Chinese high school in Davao City, Philippines. It was founded in 1953 by the Davao Evangelical Church.

History
Davao Christian High School started in the 1950s. Members of Davao Evangelical Church, then known as Davao Chinese Gospel Church, sought to provide Christian Education to the young. This vision came to reality on January 14, 1953 when Davao Chinese Gospel Church Kindergarten School was established.

The first kindergarten class of 14 was held in Atty. Rafael Lim's residence along Rizal Street. Bona Lim, a full-time church worker, served as the preschool head. She, her sister Valeria Lim and fellow church member Lourdes Chiew were the school's first teachers.

The first batch of kindergarten pupils graduated 1954 and a board of trustees was formally organized in 1957. Job Chen, a church elder, was elected the first chairman of the board.
In 1959, the school began offering Grades 1 to 4 classes in an academic building and student-teacher dormitory in Garcia Heights, Bajada. The first batch of 14 elementary pupils graduated in 1962. 

The school moved one step further by offering high school education in 1971. By 1973, the school was officially named Davao Christian High School. The first batch of 36 high school students graduated in 1975.
School population exceeded 1000 by 1982. The Student Council was organized in 1984. The DCHS Alumni Association was organized in 1987.

Soon, the Bajada campus was no longer sufficient for the growing school population and needs. The school relocated to V. Mapa Street in 1988 with the completion of the initial phase of the 3-storey U-shaped building. Construction of an air-conditioned auditorium with an 1100-seat capacity followed in 1990.

The school went for accreditation through the Association of Christian Schools, Colleges and Universities-Accrediting Agency, Inc. Both the high school and elementary departments obtained level 2 status by 1994 and 1996 respectively.

A 3-storey academic and athletic building was added in 2007. It now houses the high school classrooms and the covered basketball court. Several science laboratories and home economics laboratories were also added.

School logo
The school logo consists of a triangle with the English and Chinese names of the school, a map of Mindanao, a lighthouse and a cross. The lighthouse is a reminder that Christians ought to live as the light of the world. The map of Mindanao signifies the place where the school is situated and where the light shines forth. The cross on top identifies the centrality of Jesus Christ in the school.

References

External links 
Davao Christian High School official website

Chinese-language schools in the Philippines
Schools in Davao City
Educational institutions established in 1953
1953 establishments in the Philippines
High schools in the Philippines